Hong King is one of the 27 constituencies in the Sai Kung District in Hong Kong. The constituency returns one district councillor to the Sai Kung District Council, with an election every four years.

Hong King constituency is loosely based on Hong Sing Garden and King Ming Court, also with four private housing estates in Tseung Kwan O with estimated population of 17,828.

Councillors represented

Election results

2010s

2000s

1990s

References

Tseung Kwan O
Constituencies of Hong Kong
Constituencies of Sai Kung District Council
1994 establishments in Hong Kong
Constituencies established in 1994